Canada women's national goalball team is the women's national team of Canada. Goalball is a team sport designed specifically for athletes with a vision impairment.  The team takes part in international goalball competitions.

Paralympic Games

1984 New York 

The team competed at the 1984 Summer Paralympics, where they finished second.

1988 Seoul 

The team competed in the 1988 Summer Paralympics, from 15 to 24 October 1988, in Seoul, South Korea.  They finished third.

1992 Barcelona 

The team competed at the 1992 Summer Paralympics from 3 to 14 September 1992, in the Pavelló de la Vall d'Hebron indoor stadium, Barcelona, Spain, where they finished third.

2000 Sydney 

The team competed at the 2000 Summer Paralympics, between 18 and 29 October 2000, at an Olympic Park indoor hall,  Sydney, New South Wales, Australia, where they finished first.

Athletes were: Amy Alsop, Carrie Anton, Nathalie Chartrand, Viviane Forest, Nancy Morin, and Contessa Scott.  The team finished first.

2004 Athens 

The team competed in 2004 Summer Paralympics, between 17 and 28 September 2004, in the Faliro Sports Pavilion Arena, Athens, Greece.  Athletes were: Amy Alsop, Viviane Forest, Kelley Hannett, Annette Lisabeth, Nancy Morin, and Contessa Scott.  The team finished first.

2008 Beijing 

The team competed in 2008 Summer Paralympics, from 6 to 17 September 2008, in the Beijing Institute of Technology Gymnasium 'bat wing' arena, Beijing, China.  Athletes were: Amy Alsop, Amy Kneebone, Annette Lisabeth, Nancy Morin, Shawna Ryan, Contessa Scott.  Whilst drawing or winning during the round robin component, the team did not make the semi-finals.

2012 London 

The team competed in the 2012 Summer Paralympics from 30 August to 7 September 2012, in the Copper Box Arena, London, England.  In Group B, the team made the quarter-finals, losing to Finland, 1:2.

Athletes were Ashlie Andrews, Whitney Bogart, Amy Kneebone, Jill MacSween, Nancy Morin, and Cassie Orgeles.

Semi-final

2016 Rio de Janeiro 

The team competed in 2016 Summer Paralympics, with competition from Thursday 8 September to finals on Friday 16 September 2016, in the temporary Future Arena, Rio de Janeiro, Brazil.  They came sixth.

Quarter-final

2020 Tokyo 

The team competed in the 2020 Summer Paralympics, with competition from Wednesday 25 August to finals on Friday 3 September 2021, in the Makuhari Messe arena, Chiba, Tokyo, Japan.  The women's team qualified at the 2019 Parapan American Games.

Round-robin

World Championships 

IBSA World Goalball Championships have been held every four years from 1978.  Placing first, second or third in the tournament ensures a berth in the Paralympic Games goalball tournaments.

1982 Indianapolis 

The team competed in the 1982 World Championships, in Butler University in Indianapolis, Indiana, United States of America.  The team was one of six teams participating, and they finished third overall.

1986 Roermond 

The 1986 IBSA World Goalball Championships were held in Roermond, the Netherlands.  The team was one of ten teams participating, and they finished sixth overall.

1990 Calgary 

The team competed in the 1990 World Championships, in Calgary, Alberta, Canada.  The team was one of seven teams participating, and they finished sixth overall.

1994 Colorado Springs 

The team competed in the 1994 World Championships, in Colorado Springs, Colorado, United States of America.  The team was one of nine teams participating, and they finished fifth overall.

1998 Madrid 

The team competed in the 1998 World Championships, in Madrid, Spain.  The team was one of eleven teams participating, and they finished ninth overall.

2002 Rio de Janeiro 

The team competed in the 2002 World Championships, in Rio de Janeiro, Brazil, from 30 August 2002 to 8 September 2002.  The team was one of ten teams participating, and they finished second overall.

2006 Spartanburg 

The team competed in the 2006 World Championships, in July 2006, in Spartanburg, South Carolina, United States of America.

2010 Sheffield 

The team competed in the 2010 World Championships, from 20 to 25 June 2010, in Sheffield, England, in Pool X.

2014 Espoo 

The team did not compete in the 2014 World Championships from 30 June to 5 July 2014, in Espoo, Finland.

2018 Malmö 

Athletes for the 2018 World Championships are: Whitney Bogart (Ottawa, Ontario), Meghan Mahon (Sudbury, Ontario), Nancy Morin (Longueuil, Quebec), Emma Reinke (Saint Thomas, Ontario), Ruby Soliman (Lethbridge, Alberta).  Reserve is Brieann Baldock (Edmonton, Alberta).  Coming second in Pool D, they beat Japan 3:2 to progress to the semi-finals, where they were defeated by Russia 5:11, taking fourth place overall.

2022 Matosinhos 

The team competed in the 2022 World Championships from 7 to 16 December 2022, at the Centro de Desportos e Congressos de Matosinhos, Portugal.  There were sixteen men's and sixteen women's teams.  They placed first in Pool A, and third in final standings.

IBSA World Games

2015 Seoul 

The team competed in the 2015 IBSA World Games from 10 to 17 May 2015, in Seoul, South Korea.  They placed third to China and Israel.

Regional championships 

The team competes in the IBSA America goalball region.  The winner of the championships usually qualifies for a berth at the World Championships or the Paralympic Games.

2005 São Paulo 

The team competed at the 2005 IBSA Goalball Americas Regional Championships which were part of the Fourth IBSA Pan-American Games, the competition being from Monday 5 September 2005 to Friday 9 September 2005, in São Paulo, Brazil.  Athletes included Whitney Burk, Nancy Moran, and Contessa Scott.

There were three women's teams competing, with Brazil finished first, with USA second and Canada third.

2011 Guadalajara 

The team competed at the 2011 Parapan American Games from 13 to 19 November 2011, at the San Rafael Gymnasium in Guadalajara, Mexico.  There were five women's teams: Brazil, Canada, El Salvador, Mexico, USA.  Athletes were: Ashlie Andrews, Whitney Bogart, Amy Kneebone, Jillian MacSween, Nancy Morin, and Cassandra Orgeles.

Canada came third behind Brazil and USA.

2013 Colorado Springs 

The team competed at the 2013 Parapan American Games (which also hosted the 2013 IBSA World Youth Championships) from 11 to 14 July 2013, at Colorado Springs, Colorado, USA.

Of the three women's teams, Canada came third to Brazil and USA.

2015 Toronto 

The team competed at the 2015 Parapan American Games from 8 August 2015 to 15 August 2015, at the Mississauga Sports Centre, Toronto, Ontario, Canada.  There were six women's teams: Brazil, Canada, El Salvador, Guatemala, Nicaragua, USA.  Athletes were: Ashlie Andrews, Whitney Bogart, Tiana Knight, Jill Macsween, Nancy Morin, and Cassie Orgeles.

Canada came third,  mercing Guatemala, behind USA and Brazil.

2017 São Paulo 

The team competed at the 2017 IBSA Goalball Americas Championships from Wednesday 29 November 2017 to Sunday 3 December 2017, at São Paulo, Brazil.  There were six women's teams: Brazil, Canada, Costa Rica, Mexico, Peru, USA.

Canada beat USA to take gold.

2019 Lima 

The team competed at the 2019 Parapan American Games from 23 August 2019 to 1 September 2019, at the Miguel Grau Coliseum, Lima, Peru.  This championships was a qualifier for the 2020 Paralympic Games.  There were six women's teams: Brazil, Canada, Costa Rica, Mexico, Peru, USA.

Canada came third behind USA and Brazil.

2022 São Paulo 

Due to the ongoing COVID-19 pandemic, the IBSA America championships moved from 6 to 13 November 2021, to 18 to 22 February 2022.  The event is being held at the Centro de Treinamento Paralímpico (Paralympic Training Center) in São Paulo.  This championships is a qualifier for the 2022 World Championships.

There are twelve women's teams: Argentina, Brazil, Canada, Chile, Colombia, Costa Rica, Guatemala, Mexico, Nicaragua, Peru, USA, Venezuela.

The team composes of Amy Burk (Ontario), Brie Baldock (Alberta), Emma Reinke (Ontario), Maryam Salehizadeh (British Columbia), Meghan Mahon (Alberta), Whitney Bogart (Ontario), and Darren Hamilton (coach), Meghan Buttle (physiotherapist), and Stephen Burke (team manager).

IBSA Pan-American Games

2009 Colorado Springs 

The 2009 IBSA Pan American Games and IBSA World Youth and Student Championships were held in Colorado Springs, Colorado, United States of America.  Canada fielded a women's team of: Whitney Burk (Ottawa, ON), Amy Kneebone (Charlottetown, PEI), Annette Lisabeth (Langton, ON), Shawn Marsolais (New Westminster, BC), and Nancy Morin (Longueuil, QC).  Coaches were Janice Dawson (Calgary, AB) and Annie Pouliot (Quebec, QC), with physiotherapist Marie-Claire Holland (Ottawa, ON).

Competitive history 

 2000 Paralympic Games.  Gold.
 2004 Paralympic Games.  Gold.

The table below contains individual game results for the team in international matches and competitions.

Goal scoring by competition

See also

 Canada men's national goalball team
 Canada at the Paralympics
 Goalball at the Summer Paralympic Games

References

Goalball women's
National women's goalball teams
Canada at the Paralympics
Goalball in Canada
Goalball in the Americas